Mark Dominik (born March 9, 1971) is a former professional football executive and scout for the Kansas City Chiefs and Tampa Bay Buccaneers of the National Football League (NFL) from 1994 to 2013. Dominik joined the Tampa Bay Buccaneers after spending a year and a half working in both the college and pro personnel departments of the Kansas City Chiefs. In 1995, Dominik was named Pro Personnel Assistant with the Tampa Bay Buccaneers.  He moved up to Pro Scout, Coordinator of Pro Scouting and onto Director of Pro Scouting from 1997 to 2008.  Dominik succeeded Bruce Allen as General Manager on January 17, 2009.  Dominik held the position of General Manager from 2009 through the 2013 season.  His record as Bucs GM was 28-52. Dominik during his tenure as General Manager with the Tampa Bay Buccaneers was active in the military community.  He was a finalist in the NFL's salute to service award in 2012.  Dominik also was formerly an analyst for ESPN where he was on SportsCenter, NFL Insiders, ESPN Radio and NFL Live.  Dominik is a host on Sirius XM NFL Radio.  Born in St. Cloud, Minnesota, Dominik holds a bachelor of science degree in sports management from the University of Kansas. Currently he is a partner at X10 Capital and a "Football GM and Scouting" instructor for the online sports-career training school Sports Management Worldwide, founded and run by Dr. Lynn Lashbrook.

Front office 

As director of pro personnel, Dominik's duties included overseeing the scouting, recruiting and signing efforts of all NFL players, while also monitoring NFL transactions and overseeing player tryouts.  He was also in charge of the pro personnel department's evaluation of players in all other professional football leagues, including the Canadian Football League and the Arena Football League, while being responsible for the negotiation and signing of contracts for several free agents and NFL Draft signings. Prior to the start of the 2001 season, Dominik began the first of his eight years as director of pro personnel. In 2002, the franchise won its first world championship in Super Bowl XXXVII, a victory over the Oakland Raiders.

General manager 

Dominik headed up five draft classes while serving as the club's general manager. During his tenure the Tampa Bay Buccaneers had only one winning season (2010).  Dominik drafted 36 players while serving as the club's general manager 20 of those players extension which ranks top five of GM's during that time period. (56%)
 Gerald McCoy (defensive tackle, 2010-present) 11-year career, five-time Pro Bowl selection, three-time 1st Team All-Pro
 Roy Miller (defensive tackle, 2009-2017) 9-year starter
 Mark Barron (linebacker and safety, 2012-2020) 9-year career, 2012 All-Rookie Team
 Erik Lorig (fullback, 2010-2016) 7-year career
 Dekoda Watson (linebacker, 2010-2019) 9-year career 
 Mason Foster (linebacker, 2011-2018) 8-year career
 Mike Williams (wide receiver, 2010-2016) 6-year career, 2010 All-Rookie Team
 E.J. Biggers (cornerback, 2009-2016) 8-year career
 Lavonte David (linebacker, 2012–present) 11-year career, Pro Bowl, 1st Team All Pro, 2012 All-Rookie Team
 Luke Stocker (tight end, 2011-present) 11-year career
 Steven Means (linebacker, 2013-present) 9-year career
 Najee Goode (linebacker, 2012-2020) 9-year career
 Josh Freeman (quarterback, 2009-2015) 6-year career
 William Gholston (defensive end, 2013–present) 9-year career
 Adrian Clayborn (defensive end, 2011-2020) 10-year career
 Akeem Spence (defensive tackle, 2013-present) 9-year career
 Keith Tandy (defensive back, 2012-2018) 7-year career
 Arrelious Benn (wide receiver, 2010-2017) 8-year career
 Mike Glennon  (quarterback, 2013-present) 9-year career
 Doug Martin (running back, 2012-2018) 7-year career, two-time Pro Bowl selection, 2012 All-Rookie Team

17 draft picks signed multi-year extensions after their rookie deals expired: Miller, Biggers, Lorig, Watson, Williams, Benn, McCoy, Stocker, Foster, Clayborn, Tandy, David, Martin, Barron, Gholston, Spence and Glennon.

Signed or extended contracts of Pro Bowl players:
 Vincent Jackson 3× Pro Bowl
 Davin Joseph 2× Pro Bowl
 Donald Penn 2× Pro Bowl
 Darrelle Revis 7× Pro Bowl
 Dashon Goldson 2× Pro Bowl

References

External links
 Tampa Bay Buccaneers bio

1971 births
Living people
Kansas City Chiefs executives
Tampa Bay Buccaneers executives
National Football League general managers
University of Kansas alumni
Sportspeople from St. Cloud, Minnesota